Chimthane is a small village in the state of Maharashtra, India. It is located in the Sindkheda taluka of Dhule District in Maharashtra.

Location

Demographics

Economy

Administration

Drinking water facilities

Education Facilities

Medical Facilities

Communication Facilities

Recreation & Cultural Facilities

Transport

Rail
Chimthane does not have its own Railway Station. The nearest Railway Station is Sindkheda which is 8.5kilometres away, located on Jalgaon - Udhna Section of Western Railways.

Road Songir-Dondaicha

Air

See also
 Dhule City
 Dhule District
 List of villages in Dhule District
 List of districts of Maharashtra
 Maharashtra

External links
 Census Of India: 2001: Census Data for Chimthane Village - Code 122000
 Government of India: Ministry of Panchayati Raj

References

Villages in Dhule district